Kruppel-like factor 4 (KLF4; gut-enriched Krüppel-like factor or GKLF) is a member of the KLF family of zinc finger transcription factors, which belongs to the relatively large family of SP1-like transcription factors. KLF4 is involved in the regulation of proliferation, differentiation, apoptosis and somatic cell reprogramming. Evidence also suggests that KLF4 is a tumor suppressor in certain cancers, including colorectal cancer. It has three C2H2-zinc fingers at its carboxyl terminus that are closely related to another KLF, KLF2. It has two nuclear localization sequences that signals it to localize to the nucleus. In embryonic stem cells (ESCs), KLF4 has been demonstrated to be a good indicator of stem-like capacity. It is suggested that the same is true in mesenchymal stem cells (MSCs).

In humans, the protein is 513 amino acids, with a predicted molecular weight of approximately 55kDa, and is encoded by the KLF4 gene. The KLF4 gene is conserved in chimpanzee, rhesus monkey, dog, cow, mouse, rat, chicken, zebrafish, and frog. KLF4 was first identified in 1996.

Interactions 
KLF4 can activate transcription by interacting via it N-terminus with specific transcriptional co-activators, such as p300-CBP coactivator family. Transcriptional repression by KLF4 is carried out by KLF4 competing with an activator for binding to a target DNA sequence (9-12). KLF4 has been shown to interact with CREB-binding protein.

It was found that the transcription factor Klf4 present at the promoter of an enzymatic subunit of telomerase (TERT), where it formed a complex with β-catenin. Klf4 was required for accumulation of β-catenin at the Tert promoter but was unable to stimulate Tert expression in the absence of β-catenin.

Function 
KLF4 has diverse functions, and has been garnering attention in recent years because some of its functions are apparently contradicting, but mainly since the discovery of its integral role as one of four key factors that are essential for inducing pluripotent stem cells. KLF4 is highly expressed in non-dividing cells and its overexpression induces cell cycle arrest. KLF4 is particularly important in preventing cell division when the DNA is damaged. KLF4 is also important in regulating centrosome number and chromosome number (genetic stability), and in promoting cell survival. However, some studies have revealed that under certain conditions KLF4 may switch its role from pro-cell survival to pro-cell death.

KLF4 is expressed in the cells that are non-dividing and are terminally differentiated in the intestinal epithelium, where KLF4 is important in the regulation of intestinal epithelium homeostasis (terminal cell differentiation and proper localization of the different intestinal epithelium cell types). In the intestinal epithelium, KLF4 is an important regulator of Wnt signaling pathway genes of genes regulating differentiation.

KLF4 is expressed in a variety of tissues and organs such as: the cornea where it is required for epithelial barrier function and is a regulator of genes required for corneal homeostasis; the skin where it is required for the development of skin permeability barrier function; the bone and teeth tissues where it regulates normal skeletal development; epithelial cell of the mouse male and female reproductive tract where in the males it is important for proper spermatogenesis; vascular endothelial cells where it is critical in preventing vascular leakage in response to inflammatory stimuli; white blood cells where it mediates inflammatory responses cellular differentiation and proliferation; the kidneys where it is involved in the differentiation of embryonic stem cells and induced pluripotent stem (iPS) cells to renal lineage in vitro and its dysregulation has been linked to some renal pathologies.

Roles in diseases
Several lines of evidence have shown that KLF4 role in disease is context dependent where under certain conditions it may play one role and under different conditions it may assume a complete opposite role.
    
KLF4 is an anti-tumorigenic factor and its expression is often lost in various human cancer types, such as Colorectal cancer, gastric cancer, esophageal squamous cell carcinoma, intestinal cancer, prostate cancer, bladder cancer and lung cancer.

However, in some cancer types KLF4 may act as a tumor promoter where increased KLF4 expression has been reported, such as in oral squamous cell carcinoma and in primary breast ductal carcinoma. Also, overexpression of KLF4 in skin resulted in hyperplasia and dysplasia, which lead to the development of squamous cell carcinoma. Similar finding in esophageal epithelium was observed, where overexpression of KLF4 resulted in increased inflammation that eventually lead to the development of esophageal squamous cell cancer in mice.

The role of KLF4 in Epithelial–mesenchymal transition (EMT) is also controversial. It was shown to stimulate EMT in some systems by promoting/maintaining stemness of cancer cells, as is the case in pancreatic cancer, head and neck cancer, endometrial cancer, nasopharyngeal cancer, prostate cancer and non-small lung cancer. Under conditions of TGFβ-induced EMT KLF4 was shown to suppress EMT in the same systems where it was shown to promote EMT, such as prostate cancer and pancreatic cancer. Additionally, KLF4 was shown to suppress EMT in epidermal cancer, breast cancer, lung cancer, cisplatin-resistant nasopharyngeal carcinoma cells, and in hepatocellular carcinoma cells.

KLF4 plays an important role in several vascular diseases where it was shown to regulate vascular inflammation by controlling macrophage polarization and plaque formation in atherosclerosis. It up-regulates Apolipoprotein E, which is an anti-atherosclerotic factor. It is also involved in the regulation of angiogenesis. It may suppress angiogenesis by regulating NOTCH1 activity, while in the central nervous system its overexpression leads to vascular dysplasia.

KLF4 may promote inflammation by mediating NF-κB-dependent inflammatory pathway such as in macrophages, esophageal epithelium and in chemically-induced acute colitis in mice. Additionally, KLF-4 downregulates TNF-α-induced VCAM1 expression by targeting and blocking the binding site of NF-κB to the VCAM1 promoter.

However, KLF4 may also suppress the activation of inflammatory signaling such as in endothelial cells in response to pro-inflammatory stimuli.

KLF4 is essential for the cellular response to DNA damage. It is required for preventing cell cycle entry into mitosis following γ-irradiation-induced DNA damage, in promoting DNA repair mechanisms (20) and in preventing the irradiated cell from undergoing programmed cell death (apoptosis) (23,25,26). In one study, the in vivo importance of KLF4 in response to γ-irradiation-induced DNA damage was revealed where deletion of KLF4 specifically from the intestinal epithelium in mice lead to inability of the intestinal epithelium to regenerate and resulting in increased mortality of these mice.

Importance in Stem cells
Takahashi and Yamanaka were the first identify KLF4 as one of four factors ( oct-3/4 + sox2 + Klf4 + c-Myc ) that are required to induce mouse embryonic and adult fibroblasts into pluripotent stem cells (iPS). This was also found to be true for adult human fibroblasts. Since 2006 up to today, the work on clinically relevant research in stem cells and stem cell induction, has increased dramatically (more than 10,000 research articles, as compared to about 60 between years 1900 to 2005). In vivo functional studies on the role of KLF4 in stem cells are rare. Recently a group investigated the role of KLF4 in a particular population of intestinal stem cells, the Bmi1+ stem cells. This population of intestinal stem cells: are normally slow dividing, are known to be resistant to radiation injury, and are the ones responsible for intestinal epithelium regeneration following radiation injury. The study showed that in the intestine, following γ-irradiation-induced DNA damage, KLF4 may regulate epithelial regeneration by modulating the fate of Bmi1+((BMI1)) stem cells themselves, and consequently the development of Bmi1+ + intestinal stem cell-derived lineage.

See also 
 Kruppel-like factors

Notes

References

Further reading

External links 
 
 KLF4 microarray expression results and literature

Transcription factors